David Chariandy is a Canadian writer. 

His parents immigrated to Canada from Trinidad in the 1960s. He was born in Scarborough, Ontario. His father is from South Asian descent, whereas his mother is African. They were both working class immigrants. His surname represents his Tamil and South Indian origins from his father's side.  

Chariandy has a MA from Carleton and a PhD from York University. He lives in Vancouver and teaches in the department of English at Simon Fraser University.

Chariandy's family includes his wife and two children: a son and a daughter. In his work he explores the truest meaning of origins and birthplace for immigrants and their children growing up in another part of the world but still belonging to another.

Recurring themes and cultural contexts 
Chariandy's novels are set in Scarborough, an eastern region of Toronto, Ontario. This area is known for its immigrant heavy population and has been sometime stigmatized by a reputation for crime, although statistics do not support this perception.

Chariandy told the Toronto Star:If I’m honest, I always wanted to write a story that evoked the complexities of growing up young and Black in Scarborough...Throughout my entire life growing up in Scarborough and returning to it even as a young adult, I always felt so discomforted by the negative stories of Scarborough that would circulate in the newspapers and tabloids and sometimes by word of mouth, among people who really didn’t know Scarborough that well. His novels offer up a story of Scarborough that admit "challenges, but tell that bigger story of life and vitality that you don’t always see in headlines."

His non-fiction book I’ve Been Meaning to Tell You: A Letter to My Daughter was inspired by both a racist incident he experienced while at a Vancouver restaurant with his three-year-old daughter and then, years later, by the Quebec City mosque shooting in 2017.

Chariandy's novel Brother, the 2017 winner of the Rogers Writers' Trust Fiction Prize has been optioned for film, and went into production in fall 2021 under the direction of Clement Virgo. The film, Brother, is slated to premiere at the 2022 Toronto International Film Festival.

Awards and honors
Chariandy's debut novel, Soucouyant, was published in 2007. It was longlisted for the 2007 Scotiabank Giller Prize, and the 2008 International Dublin Literary Award; and was shortlisted for the 2007 Governor General's Award for English-language fiction, the 2008 Commonwealth Writers' Prize for Best First Book of Canada and the Caribbean, the 2008 Ethel Wilson Fiction Prize, the 2008 City of Toronto Book Award, the 2008 ReLit Award for fiction, and the 2007 Books in Canada First Novel Award. 

His novel Brother won the Rogers Writers' Trust Fiction Prize in 2017, the Toronto Book Award and the Ethel Wilson Fiction Prize in 2018.  This novel tells the story of Michael and his older brother Francis, who grow up in Scarborough, raised by an immigrant mother beleaguered by the financial and social difficulties of single racialized parenthood. The Globe and Mail called it "a supremely moving and exquisitely crafted portrait of his hometown".  

Chariandy won the 2019 Windham–Campbell Literature Prize in Fiction.

Bibliography
 Soucouyant: A Novel of Forgetting (2007)
 Brother (2017)
 I've Been Meaning to Tell You: A Letter to My Daughter (2018)

References

External links

 David Chariandy at Arsenal Pulp Press

Canadian male novelists
Canadian people of Trinidad and Tobago descent
Canadian people of Tamil descent
People of Dougla descent
Black Canadian writers
Writers from Scarborough, Toronto
Writers from Vancouver
Academic staff of Simon Fraser University
Living people
21st-century Canadian novelists
21st-century Canadian male writers
Year of birth missing (living people)
Canadian writers of Asian descent